Hannah Momoh (born as Hannah Victoria Lucinda Wilson) served as First Lady of Sierra Leone from 28 November 1985 – 29 April 1992. In 1967 she married Joseph Saidu Momoh, 2nd President of Sierra Leone. They had one daughter.

References 

Living people
First Ladies of Sierra Leone
Year of birth missing (living people)